John Raymond O'Neill (19 January 1891 – 18 July 1951) was a Conservative member of the House of Commons of Canada. He was born in Almonte, Ontario and became a promoter and prospector.

O'Neill attended school at Almonte then St. Michael's College and the University of Toronto where he attained his Bachelor of Arts degree.

He made an unsuccessful bid for a Legislative Assembly of Ontario seat in the 1923 provincial election.

He was elected to Parliament at the Timiskaming North riding in the 1925 general election. After serving only one term, the 15th Canadian Parliament, he was defeated by Joseph-Arthur Bradette of the Liberals.

References

External links
 

1891 births
1951 deaths
Conservative Party of Canada (1867–1942) MPs
Members of the House of Commons of Canada from Ontario
University of Toronto alumni
People from Almonte, Ontario